Picture tube may refer to:

Cathode-ray tube, a common component of electronics such as televisions and other displays,
Picture Tube (Paint Shop Pro), a small digital image with no background, used as an individual illustration on personal web pages, internet forums, social networking sites and similar.